Alright Already may refer to:

 Alright, Already: Live in Montréal, a 2005 EP by Rufus Wainwright
 "Alright Already" (song), a song by Larry Stewart
 "Alright, Already", a song by Combustible Edison from Schizophonic!
 "Alright Already!", a song by Little Nobody from Pop Tart
 Alright Already (TV series), a 1997 sitcom starring Carol Leifer

See also 
 "Alright Already Now", a song by The Hellacopters from Grande Rock
 "Already Alright", a song by Yolanda Adams from The Experience